Véraza may refer to:
 Véraza commune in Aude department, France
 Véraza culture, archaeological culture (local development of the Chasséen culture), dated appr. 3400/3300 and 2700/2600 BC and named after the aforesaid commune.